Robert Kirkman's The Walking Dead: Search and Destroy is a post-apocalyptic horror novel written by Jay Bonansinga and was released on October 18, 2016. The novel is a spin-off of The Walking Dead comic book series, and it is the seventh novel based on the series. It continues to explore the story of Lilly Caul as her group deals with new enemies. The Walking Dead: Search and Destroy is the third book in a four-part series of novels.

Plot
One year after defeating Garlitz's cult, Lilly and her band of survivors start a friendly alliance with other small town settlements and begin a project to refurbish the railroad between Woodbury and Atlanta to create a safer travel method.

While repairing on the railroad, a brutal group attacks Woodbury by burning the walls and killing the adults, then kidnapping the children. Lilly Caul and her group attempt to rescue the children.

References

2016 American novels
Thomas Dunne Books books
Search and Destroy